Isabelle Hudon (born 1967) is a Canadian businesswoman and diplomat. She is currently the President and CEO of the Business Development Bank of Canada. From 2017-2021, she served as Canadian Ambassador to France and Monaco. She was the first female Canadian Ambassador to France. Previously, she served as Executive Chair, Quebec and Senior Vice-President, Client Solutions for Sun Life Financial.

Career 
Isabelle Hudon's mother was a mathematics teacher and her father, Jean-Guy Hudon, the former mayor of Beauharnois where she grew up. She did not go to the university, and started her career right away in 1988 working seven years with her father who was a member of the House of Commons of Canada. In 1990, she became the attaché presse of Monique Landry. In 1993, she became the assistant of the former Prime Minister's wife Mila Mulroney (Hudon's husband Paul Smith was the assistant of Brian Mulroney). Her husband moved to Fontaineblau to study at the INSEAD and she followed him there.

Hudon began her professional career in federal politics in various departments, including in the office of the Minister responsible for the Canadian International Development Agency. She then held strategic positions in the private sector at Bell Global Solutions, the Canadian Space Agency (CSA), Bombardier Aerospace and BCE Media. 

Hudon was President and Chief Executive Officer of the Board of Trade of Metropolitan Montreal from 2004 to 2008. She then served as President of the advertising agency Marketel, a position she held until joining Sun Life Financial (SFL) in 2010. From 2010 to 2015, she was the president of SFL Quebec.

On September 29, 2017, she was appointed as Canadian Ambassador to France by Prime Minister Justin Trudeau. 

In June 2018, Hudon served as co-chair of the Gender Equality Advisory Council at the G7 summit meeting in La Malbaie, Quebec.

On October 29, 2019, following the 2019 Canadian federal election, in which the Liberal Party lost seats in Quebec, the Prime Minister's Office announced that Prime Minister Justin Trudeau had hired Hudon as an adviser. The Office said McLellan would assist the Prime Minister as he formed a government.

Hudon became the first woman President and CEO of Business Development Bank of Canada on 10 August 2021.

Board memberships 
Hydro-Québec
Holt Renfrew Canada
The Mount Royal Club
The Canada Council for the Arts

Honours
Réalisations award from the Réseau des femmes d’affaires du Québec in 2014
Queen Elizabeth II Diamond Jubilee Medal
Medal of the National Assembly of Québec (2016), for her commitment to the cause of women’s ambition  
Named one of the 40 most successful Canadians under the age of 40 (Canada’s Top 40 under 40) in 2005
Inducted into the Canada’s Most Powerful Women: Top 100 Hall of Fame in 2014 (she was named to this list in 2006, 2012 and 2013)

References 

Living people
1967 births
Ambassadors of Canada to France
Canadian women ambassadors
Canadian women chief executives